Dieunomia heteropoda is a species of sweat bee in the family Halictidae. It is found in Central America and North America.

Subspecies
These two subspecies belong to the species Dieunomia heteropoda:
 Dieunomia heteropoda heteropoda (Say, 1824)
 Dieunomia heteropoda kirbii (Smith, 1865)

References

Further reading

External links

 

Halictidae
Articles created by Qbugbot
Insects described in 1824